Lloyd Township is one of twelve townships in Dickinson County, Iowa, USA.  As of the 2000 census, its population was 616.

History
Lloyd Township is named for John Lloyd, a pioneer settler.

Geography
According to the United States Census Bureau, Lloyd Township covers an area of 35.88 square miles (92.92 square kilometers).

Cities, towns, villages
 Terril

Adjacent townships
 Richland Township (north)
 Estherville Township, Emmet County (northeast)
 Twelve Mile Lake Township, Emmet County (east)
 Lost Island Township, Palo Alto County (southeast)
 Lake Township, Clay County (south)
 Meadow Township, Clay County (southwest)
 Milford Township (west)
 Center Grove Township (northwest)

Cemeteries
The township contains Fairview Cemetery.

School districts
 Terril Community School District

Political districts
 Iowa's 5th congressional district
 State House District 06
 State Senate District 03

References
 United States Census Bureau 2007 TIGER/Line Shapefiles
 United States Board on Geographic Names (GNIS)
 United States National Atlas

External links

 
US-Counties.com
City-Data.com

Townships in Dickinson County, Iowa
Townships in Iowa